Henri Baudin (1882–1953) was a French film actor of the silent era.

Selected filmography
 The Crushed Idol (1920)
 Les Trois Mousquetaires (1921)
 Sarati the Terrible (1923)
 The Bread Peddler (1923)
 Little Jacques (1923)
 The Thruster (1924)
 Terror (1924)
 The Woman in Gold (1926)
 The Good Reputation (1926)
 Cousin Bette (1928)
 Pawns of Passion (1928)
 Sowing the Wind (1929)
 The Waltz King (1930)
 The Three Musketeers (1932)

References

Bibliography
 Goble, Alan. The Complete Index to Literary Sources in Film. Walter de Gruyter, 1999.

External links

1882 births
1953 deaths
French male film actors
Male actors from Lyon